HMS Megaera was originally constructed as an iron screw frigate for the Royal Navy, and was one of the last and largest ships built by William Fairbairn's Millwall shipyard.

Launched on 22 May 1849, HMS Megaera was one of the first iron ships ordered by the Royal Navy. She was named after the mythological figure Megaera, one of the Erinyes (or Furies, in Roman mythology).

Megaera never saw service as a frigate; just as she entered service, a series of experiments showed that the iron then used in shipbuilding exhibited splintering characteristics which rendered unprotected ships of her type unsuitable for use as warships. The Royal Navy opted to remove the armament from Megaera and her four sister ships and instead employ them as storeships and transports. However, Megaera and her sister ships were not well suited to their new role. Their accommodation was unsuited to carrying large numbers of personnel and their steaming power was poor.

On her maiden voyage as a troopship on 7 June 1851, she broke down and had to be towed back to port. Megaera was refitted and sailed again, ordered to use her sails to conserve coal. She subsequently saw service as a storeship in the Crimea, and some of her crew saw action in a shore landing-party. Following the end of the war in 1856 she resumed routine voyages with stores and replacement personnel for military and naval units.

Following a change in military strategy the Megaera evacuated a small detachment of 21 Royal Artillery Soldiers from the Island of St Vincent on 10 May 1853 landing them at Barbados 2 days later.

Final voyage 
She suffered damage in a storm and put in at Queenstown, Ireland, for repairs. The ship's officers complained that the vessel was overloaded with baggage and riding too low in the water; there was an article in The Times, questions were asked in the House of Commons and eventually an inspection resulted in 127 tons of cargo being removed.

On 28 May, Megaera departed Simonstown, South Africa. Aboard her were 42 officers, 180 sailors, and 67 recruits en route to Australia. On 8 June, a leak was reported in the ship's hold, and for some days was managed using hand-pumps and bailing. Around 14 June it became more serious, and the water began to gain on the pumps. The steam pumps were then brought into play, and they managed to keep the inflow in check. On 15 June Captain Thrupp decided to steer for the nearest land, the uninhabited Saint Paul Island, where he could anchor and examine the hull.

Saint Paul Island 

However, the anchor cable broke and they were obliged to take the diver back on board before he could carry out any work. After she snapped a second anchor cable, Megaeras divers were finally able to make an inspection and the leak was found: one of her iron plates was worn away, and had a hole whose edges were so thin they could be bent by hand. In addition, many of the ship's beams were corroded through at the bottom, and others nearly so.

As Thrupp stated in his later despatch concerning the wreck, the ship's girders were separating from the bottom, the bottom was leaky in one place and very thin in many others, and the pumps were continually becoming choked with thick pieces of iron.

Since the weather was very stormy, and the anchorage could not be depended on, Thrupp announced to the ship's company on the morning of Sunday, 18 June, after reading prayers, that they would land at once. The following day, due to the stormy weather, which had halted the landing of stores, and the difficulty in keeping the ship in position (she had had three anchors carried away and lost since first anchoring), it was decided to beach her. Her provisions and stores were put ashore over the following week, and she was not finally abandoned for 11 days, when Captain Thrupp declared the dangerous wreckage to be off-limits. Two-thirds of the cargo had by then been unloaded.

Rescue 
On 16 July, Captain Visier of the Dutch vessel Aurora spotted the flagpole which Megaeras crew had erected and Lieutenant Lewis Jones sailed with her to Surabaya, Java, which they reached on 2 August. He despatched telegrams to the British Consul in Batavia and to the Royal Navy Commodore in Hong Kong, who ordered HMS Rinaldo to sail to the rescue.

On 7 August, a second Dutch ship took five men from Saint Paul Island, and on the same day the captain of the British clipper Mountain Laurel asked to be paid to rescue the crew of Megaera, claiming that he would have to jettison his cargo to accommodate so many people. Captain Thrupp declined this offer and on 26 August Lieutenant Jones arrived on the British merchant steamship Oberon with supplies. On 29 August, the Dutch vessel Malacca arrived and took off the remaining survivors of the shipwreck, which she conveyed to Sydney. The Rinaldo was blown off the island, and so played no route in the rescue. En route to Australia the Malacca encountered a homeward-bound mail steamer, which Captain Thrupp transferred to.

Aftermath 
Captain Thrupp and his crew subsequently faced a court martial in November 1871 at Plymouth and a Royal Commission was appointed to inquire into the loss of the ship. Thrupp was subsequently honourably acquitted when the court decided that the beaching of the ship was perfectly justifiable.

References

Notes

Frigates of the Royal Navy
Shipwrecks in the Indian Ocean
Ships built in Millwall
Maritime incidents in June 1871
1849 ships
Steam frigates of the Royal Navy